El Fedjoudj Boughrara Saoudi  is a town and commune in Oum El Bouaghi Province, Algeria. According to the 1998 census, it has a population of 3, 658.

Localities  of the commune 
The commune is composed of 13 localities:

References

Communes of Oum El Bouaghi Province
Oum El Bouaghi Province